Sunset Beach State Recreation Site is a state park in Clatsop County, Oregon, United States, administered by the Oregon Parks and Recreation Department.  The park comprises  along the Pacific Ocean on the Clatsop Plains.

See also
Lewis and Clark National Historical Park
List of Oregon state parks
Sunset Beach, Oregon

References

State parks of Oregon
Parks in Clatsop County, Oregon